Coeliades aeschylus, the Senegal blue policeman, is a butterfly of the family Hesperiidae. It is found in Senegal, Gambia, Guinea-Bissau, Mali, Guinea, Burkina Faso, and Sierra Leone (north). The habitat consists of the Guinea savanna zone.

The larvae feed on Acridocarpus smeathmanni.

References

Butterflies described in 1884
Coeliadinae
Butterflies of Africa